Gilbert Deane was an Anglican priest in Ireland during the second half of the seventeenth century.

Deane was born in Jerpoint and educated at Trinity College, Dublin.  He was Archdeacon of Ossory from 1636 and Prebendary of Tasagart in St Patrick's Cathedral, Dublin from 1646, holding both positions until his death in 1661.

References

Alumni of Trinity College Dublin
Archdeacons of Ossory
1661 deaths
17th-century Irish Anglican priests
People from County Kilkenny